ECAI may refer to:

 European Conference on Artificial Intelligence
 Electronic Cultural Atlas Initiative
 External Credit Assessment Institutions